Julie Neubert is a British actress, known for playing the ill-fated Wendy in the first series of Survivors in 1975.

Other regular roles have included playing Judy Matthews in Family Affairs and Joan Hope in Brookside. Her other television credits include: Shoestring, Inspector Morse, Harbour Lights, Softly, Softly and Doomwatch. In 2019, she appeared in an episode of Doctors'' as Ruth Webster.

External links
 

Year of birth missing (living people)
Living people
British television actresses